Montgomery Daniel (born 1954) is a Vincentian politician. Montgomery is also the Unity Labour Party North Windward candidate for 2020 Vincentian general election. He has been elected as the Member of Parliament for the constituency of North Windward in the House of Assembly of Saint Vincent and the Grenadines since 2001.

References

Living people
1954 births
Political office-holders in Saint Vincent and the Grenadines
Unity Labour Party politicians